Robert William Otto Allen  (18 March 1852 – 9 December 1888) was a Danish pianist, composer and conductor. He was the brother of conductor Georg Frederik Ferdinand Allen.

He trained at the Royal Academy of Music as a student of Edmund Neupert. From the late 1870s he was a music teacher in Aarhus and in 1885 he became organist at Århus Cathedral. He was a frequent contributor to the Aarhus music scene both as a pianist, as conductor and as a composer.

Notable compositions include Koncertouverture i G-Dur (1881), Ouverture til Dina (1886) and Løft dit hoved, du raske gut (1883).

References

Male composers
Danish classical pianists
Danish classical organists
Male classical organists
1852 births
1888 deaths
19th-century Danish composers
19th-century classical pianists
Male classical pianists
19th-century Danish male musicians
19th-century organists